The Ministry of Skill Development and Entrepreneurship is a Ministry of Government of Maharashtra to coordinate all skill development,Employment and entrepreneurship efforts in Maharashtra.

The Ministry is headed by Cabinet Minister Mangal Lodha
since 14 August 2022.

Head office

List of Cabinet Ministers

List of Ministers of State

List of Principal Secretary

Structure
Ministry has different departments and societies which look after skill development and entrepreneurship activities. Cabinet Minister is head of the Ministry and Minister of State assists Cabinet Minister in day-to-day activities. Bureaucrats are appointed to govern various programs of the Ministry.

Department of Skill Development, Employment and Entrepreneurship (SDEED)
SDEED is responsible for execution of the Maharashtra State Innovative Startup Policy.

Leadership
Along with ministers, members from Civil Services of India lead department
Mangal Lodha, Cabinet Minister
 Vacant, Minister of State
Smt. Manisha Verma, IAS (I/C Principal Secretary)
Shri. N. K. Bhosale (Joint Secretary) 
Shri. Shrinivas Shastri (Deputy Secretary) 
Smt. Manjusha A. Karande.  (Deputy Secretary) 
Santosh Rokade (Under Secretary) 
Vinod Bondre (Under Secretary) 
Pranali Gosavi (Under Secretary)

Maharashtra State Skill Development Society (MSSDS)
Maharashtra State Skill Development Society (MSSDS) was established on 15 February 2011 under the Societies Registration Act 1860. MSSDS is responsible for looking after skill development training programs in Maharashtra

Directorate of Vocational Education & Training (DVET)
Directorate of Vocational Education & Training (DVET) was separated from  Department of Technical Education in 1984 to facilitate Technical Education activities.

Maharashtra State Innovation Society (MSIS)
Maharashtra State Innovation Society was established in 2018 and it comes under Ministry of Entrepreneurship and it is a nodal government agency to promote innovation-driven entrepreneurial ecosystem in the state of Maharashtra

References

External links

Government ministries of Maharashtra
Entrepreneurship in India